The Smurfs All Star Show is a children's music album released in 1981. It contains several traditional tunes with modified lyrics, with reference to the world of The Smurfs.

Track listing
Side One
 The Smurfs All Star Show - Music: Alex Alberts / English lyrics: Linlee/Helna/Corbett
 Welcome To Smurfland - Music: Pierre Kartner / English lyrics: Linlee, Corbett
 Catch Me - Music: Steven Schoenzetter / English lyrics: Linlee, Corbett
 Old Papa Smurf - trad./arr.: E. Mergency/Helna/ R. Klunz
 Silly Shy Smurf - Music/Lyrics: B. Corbett/ J. de Piesses
 Smurfing Land Express - Music: Pierre Kartner / English lyrics: Linlee, Helna, Corbett
 Smurf a Happy Tune - Music: Pierre Kartner / English lyrics: Linlee, Corbett

Side Two
 The Clapping and Jumping Song - Music and lyrics: B. Corbett/J. de Piesses/Helna
 Yankee Doodle - trad./arr.: E. Mergency/ R. Klunz
 London Bridge is Falling Down - trad./arr.: E. Mergency, R. Klunz
 Smurfing Days - Music/Lyrics: B. Corbett/J. de Piesses
 Space Smurfs - Music/Lyrics: B. Corbett, J. de Piesses, Helna
 Rock-A-Bye Baby - trad./arr.: E. Mergency, R. Klunz

See also
The Smurfs music

External links
 Commercial at RetroJunk

The Smurfs music
1981 albums
Children's music albums